Santa María de Fe is a town and district located in the Misiones Department in Paraguay, located about 15 km from the city of San Ignacio.

Geography
The district of Santa María de Fe is located in the Eastern Region of Paraguay. It's located 253 km south of Asuncion, the capital of the country, one arrives at Santa Maria, taking the National Route Number 1, and then taking a detour between the cities of San Ignacio and Santa Rosa.

Limits
The district of Santa María is bordered by the following districts:
 North: district of San Miguel and the department of Caazapá
 East: district of Santa Rosa
 South: districts of San Ignacio and Santa Rosa
 West: San Ignacio

Demography
According to the 2002 Census, Santa María has a total population of 7,385 inhabitants, of which 1,981 lives in the urban area of the district.

External links 

Populated places in the Misiones Department